La hija de Juana Crespo is a Venezuelan telenovela written by Salvador Garmendia and José Ignacio Cabrujas and produced by Radio Caracas Television in 1977.

Mayra Alejandra, José Luis Rodríguez and Jean Carlo Simancas starred as the protagonists.

Cast
Mayra Alejandra as Diana Crespo
José Luis Rodríguez as Gustavo
Hilda Vera as Juana Crespo
Jean Carlo Simancas as David
Alberto Marín as Miguel
Rafael Cabrera as Raúl Moros
 as Beatriz
Rafael Briceño
Zulay García
Roberto Gray
Arturo Calderón
Virgilio Galindo
Fausto Verdial
Tania Sarabia
Carlos Villamizar
Otto Rodríguez
Mahuampi Acosta

References

External links

1977 telenovelas
RCTV telenovelas
Venezuelan telenovelas
1977 Venezuelan television series debuts
1977 Venezuelan television series endings
Spanish-language telenovelas
Television shows set in Caracas